Travis Muller (born 4 March 1993) is a South African cricketer who now lives in New Zealand.

Muller bowls right-arm fast and is a tail-end batsman. He signed a semi-pro contract with the Cape Cobras at the start of the 2012/13 season. He represented the South Africa Under-19 cricket team in early 2012 with limited success. He was included in the Western Province cricket team for the 2015 Africa T20 Cup.

Muller now lives in New Zealand, where he plays for Otago A. In 2018 he signed a declaration of intent to play for New Zealand. On 1 December 2020, in round two of the 2020–21 Ford Trophy, Muller took his first five-wicket haul in List A cricket.

References

1993 births
Living people
South African cricketers
Cape Cobras cricketers
Otago cricketers
Western Province cricketers
South African emigrants to New Zealand